Greenwood is a community on Saint Albans Bay on Lake Minnetonka in Hennepin County, Minnesota, United States just northeast of the community of Excelsior, Minnesota. The population was 688 at the 2010 census.

Geography
Minnesota State Highway 7 serves as a main route.

History
Originally part of Excelsior Township, Greenwood was incorporated as an independent city in 1956.

Demographics

2010 census
As of the census of 2010, there were 688 people, 290 households, and 223 families living in the city. The racial makeup of the city was 95.3% White, 0.6% African American, 0.3% Native American, 1.9% Asian, 0.1% from other races, and 1.7% from two or more races. Hispanic or Latino of any race were 2.0% of the population.

There were 290 households, of which 27.9% had children under the age of 18 living with them, 70.0% were married couples living together, 3.4% had a female householder with no husband present, 3.4% had a male householder with no wife present, and 23.1% were non-families. 19.0% of all households were made up of individuals, and 5.9% had someone living alone who was 65 years of age or older. The average household size was 2.37 and the average family size was 2.70.

The median age in the city was 49.8 years. 19.3% of residents were under the age of 18; 4.3% were between the ages of 18 and 24; 17.1% were from 25 to 44; 45.2% were from 45 to 64; and 14% were 65 years of age or older. The gender makeup of the city was 51.9% male and 48.1% female.

2000 census
As of the census of 2000, there were 729 people, 285 households, and 214 families living in the city. The racial makeup of the city was 96.57% White, 0.69% African American, 0.55% Asian, 1.23% from other races, and 0.96% from two or more races. Hispanic or Latino of any race were 2.47% of the population.

There were 285 households, out of which 34.0% had children under the age of 18 living with them, 68.8% were married couples living together, 4.2% had a female householder with no husband present, and 24.6% were non-families. 18.9% of all households were made up of individuals, and 6.0% had someone living alone who was 65 years of age or older.  The average household size was 2.56 and the average family size was 2.96.

In the city, the population was spread out, with 25.9% under the age of 18, 2.9% from 18 to 24, 26.7% from 25 to 44, 34.8% from 45 to 64, and 9.6% who were 65 years of age or older.  The median age was 42 years. For every 100 females, there were 107.1 males.  For every 100 females age 18 and over, there were 103.8 males.

The median income for a household in the city was $102,719, and the median income for a family was $127,013. Males had a median income of $69,375 versus $41,786 for females. The per capita income for the city was $63,200.  About 0.4% of families and 0.8% of the population were below the poverty line, including 1.3% of those under age 18 and none of those age 65 or over.

Politics

Economy
Greenwood is home to the Old Log Theatre.

References

External links
 City of Greenwood Minnesota Website
 ePodunk: Profile for Greenwood, Minnesota 

Cities in Minnesota
Cities in Hennepin County, Minnesota